John James Pulleine (10 September 1841, Spennithorne, Yorkshire - 15 April 1913) was an Anglican Suffragan Bishop in the latter part of the 19th and earliest part of the 20th century.

John James Pulleine was born in Spennithorne, Yorkshire on 10 September 1841, son of the Reverend Robert Pulleine, sometime Rector of Kirby Wiske. He was educated at Marlborough and Trinity College, Cambridge and ordained in 1868. He began his career with a curacy at St Giles-in-the-Fields after which he was appointed Rector of his father's old parish.  Appointed Suffragan to assist the Bishop of Ripon in 1888 he initially took the title of Bishop of Penrith as this was one of the 26 titles permitted by the Act passed by Henry VIII but this was changed to the more relevant Bishop of Richmond when the Bishops Suffragan Nominations Act was passed. “A man whose long experience rendered his counsel invaluable in diocesan affairs”, he died on 15 April 1913.

He married and had children, including a son John James Pulleine.

Notes

|-

1841 births
People educated at Marlborough College
Alumni of Trinity College, Cambridge
1913 deaths
Bishops of Penrith
19th-century Church of England bishops
20th-century Church of England bishops
Anglican bishops of Richmond
People from Richmondshire (district)